H20 is an important Ukraine national highway (H-highway) in the Donetsk Oblast, Donbas, Ukraine, running mainly north–south and connecting Sloviansk though Donetsk with Mariupol on the shores of Taganrog Bay in the Sea of Azov near the mouth of the Kalmius River. It passes through Kramatorsk, Druzhkivka, Oleksijevo-Druzhkivka & Osykove, Kostiantynivka, Berestok, Romanivka, Kamianka in Yasynuvats’kyi, Makiivka, Donetsk, Dolya in Volnovas'kyi, Syhnal'ne-Olenivka in Marinskyi, Berezove in Marinskyi, Novotroits'ke in Volnovas'kyi, Buhas, Volnovakha, Dmytrivka, Polkove, Pryvil'ne, Hranitne, and Kasyanivka in Telmanove Raion.

Before 1998, the road was designated as P40 and was P19 from 1998 to 2006.

War in Donbas
Significant armed conflict has occurred along and near the H20 during the War in Donbas.  On 13 January 2015, pro-Russia militants attacked a bus near Buhas and Volnovakha.

Main route

Main route and connections to/intersections with other highways in Ukraine.

See also

 Roads in Ukraine
 Ukraine Highways
 Volodymyr Boiko Stadium

References

External links
National Roads in Ukraine in Russian

Roads in Donetsk Oblast